Aberystwyth power station supplied electricity to the town of Aberystwyth from 1895 to the 1970s. The oil-engine station was operated by a succession of private and public owners including Aberystwyth Corporation prior to the nationalisation of the electricity industry in 1948. The power station, with an ultimate capacity of 5 MW, was redeveloped as demand for electricity grew and old plant was replaced.

History
In 1892 Aberystwyth Corporation applied for a Provisional Order under the Electric Lighting Acts to generate and supply electricity to the town. This was granted by the Board of Trade and was confirmed by Parliament through the Electric Lighting Orders Confirmation (No. 2) Act 1892 (55 & 56 Vict. c. xxxvii).

The following year the Provisional Order was transferred to the Bourne & Grant Electricity Supply Company Limited. The Company, which was registered 13 May 1893, built a power station in Mill Street Aberystwyth (52°24'45"N 4°05'03"W) and first supplied electricity to the town in August 1895. The company was renamed the Aberystwyth & Chiswick Electric Supply Corporation Limited as the company also supplied electricity to the Chiswick district in west London, although the two systems were not interconnected. By 1904 the company name changed to the Chiswick Electric Supply Corporation Limited but it continued to develop electricity supplies in Aberystwyth.

The Central Electricity Board constructed the national grid (1927–33) to connect power stations within a region. However, Aberystwyth was remote from the grid and continued to run independently. The Chiswick Corporation noted that of all the fuel oil stations in the country of similar output the Aberystwyth station was ranked fourth in terms of thermal efficiency.

Aberystwyth Corporation took over the operation of the electricity undertaking in 1936. The Corporation continued as the owner of the power station and supply system until nationalisation of the British electricity supply industry in 1948. The Aberystwyth electricity undertaking was abolished, ownership of Aberystwyth power station was vested in the British Electricity Authority, and subsequently the Central Electricity Authority and the Central Electricity Generating Board (CEGB). At the same time the electricity distribution and sales responsibilities of the Aberystwyth electricity undertaking were transferred to the Merseyside & North Wales Electricity Board (MANWEB).

Equipment specification
The original plant at Aberystwyth power station comprised Browett-Lindley oil engines coupled by ropes and belts to Johnson & Phillips’ generators. In 1898 the maximum load was 74 kW.

Plant in 1923
By 1923 the generating plant comprised:

Generators:

 1 × 80 kW oil fired engine
 1 × 100 kW oil fired engine
 1 × 170 kW oil fired engine
 1 × 120 kW steam driven reciprocating engine

These machines gave a total generating capacity of 470 kW of direct current.

Electricity supplies to consumers were at 440 & 220 Volt DC.

Plant in 1958
The plant in 1958 comprised:

 5 × English Electric diesel engine sets, totalling 2,670 kW (installed 1915 to 1948)
 3 × 750 kW Brush / General Motors diesel engine sets (installed 1951–52)

The total installed generating capacity was 4.92 MW, with an output capacity of 5 MW.

Operations
In 1897 the maximum electricity demand was 74 kW, and the station supplied 46,033 kWh.

Operating data 1921–23
The operating data for the period 1921–23 was:

Operating data 1946
Aberystwyth power station operating data for 1946 was:

Operating data 1954–72
Operating data for the period 1954–72 was:

Aberystwyth Electricity Supply District
Aberystwyth was an electricity supply district in the Merseyside & North Wales Electricity Board. It supplied an area of 606 square miles (1570 km2) and a population of 40,000. It comprised the Borough of Aberystwyth and the districts of Dolgelley, Machynlleth and Towyn. Electricity supplies were:

Closure
Aberystwyth power station was decommissioned in the 1970s.

See also
 Timeline of the UK electricity supply industry
 List of power stations in Wales

References

Former power stations in Wales
Demolished power stations in the United Kingdom
Buildings and structures in Aberystwyth